Roberto "Bobot" Sison Sebastian (May 2, 1944 – July 23, 2012) was a Filipino government official and former Secretary of the Department of Agriculture.

Life and career
Sebastian was born in Manila, Philippines. He was once a staunch figure in the Philippine banana industry which opened him the opportunity to serve in the Philippine government. He started out with the Philippine Packing Corp. (PPC) and moved to manage the Marsman (MEPI) banana plantations from 1976 to 1992 and from 1996 to 2002 and was the company's president and CEO.

Personal life
He married Melba Erum Regis on August 8, 1970 and has 3 children with her: Rommel Patton Regis Sebastian, June Genevieve Regis Sebastian and Roberto Charles Regis Sebastian, Jr. He has 2 daughters-in-law: Marie Nina Carmen Nasser Carriedo-Sebastian (wife of Rommel) and Maria Veronica Medina-Sebastian (wife of Roberto Jr.). He has 2 grandsons from Roberto Jr. and Maria Veronica: Roberto Nicholas Medina Sebastian and Francisco Ramon Medina Sebastian.

Political career
In 1992, President Fidel V. Ramos picked Sebastian as Department of Agriculture chief who introduced the Key Production Approach (KPA) which became the basis in the formulation of the Medium-Term Agricultural Development Plan (MTADP). The MTADP laid down the foundation for the ascension of the Philippine agriculture to meet the challenge of competing globally.

Sebastian served the Philippine Department of Agriculture from 1992 to 1996. Thereafter, from 1996 to 1997 Mr. Sebastian served as the country’s Special Envoy for Agriculture to the World Trade Organization. He also served as president of various industry groups like the Philippine Banana Growers and Exporters Association (PBGEA), Confederation of Philippine Exporters Foundation, Inc. in Region 11 and Samahang Magsasaging ng Davao, Inc.  He was also a member of the Philippine Business for Social Progress, Davao City Chamber of Commerce, Inc. and Rotary Club of Davao.

Death
Sebastian died on Monday, July 23, 2012 at the age of 68 due to a massive heart attack. His remains lie in state at the Heritage Park in Fort Bonifacio, Taguig City until Wednesday, July 25, and will be flown to Davao City on Thursday, July 26. The Department of Agriculture (DA) headed by Secretary Proceso J. Alcala has expressed sorrow: “The Department is saddened for his loss and we wish that his family, relatives, and friends will find solace and strength in his memories. We do share their grief, and our thoughts and prayers continue to be with them as they gradually overcome this moment of grief,” Alcala said in a statement

References

External links
Ex-DA chief Sebastian dies at 69 via Department of Agriculture

1944 births
2012 deaths
People from Davao City
Secretaries of Agriculture of the Philippines
Ramos administration cabinet members
Ateneo de Manila University alumni
University of California, Davis alumni